Grube is a river in Wismar, Mecklenburg-Vorpommern, Germany. It discharges into the old port of Wismar, which is connected to the Baltic Sea.

See also
List of rivers of Mecklenburg-Vorpommern

Rivers of Mecklenburg-Western Pomerania
Rivers of Germany